The Baoneng Group (legal name Baoneng Investment Group Co., Ltd.) is a Chinese property and financial services conglomerate controlled by Chinese billionaire Yao Zhenhua, China's 52nd-wealthiest person as of August 2020.

History
The first predecessor of Baoneng was established in 1992 when Yao Zhenhua, taking advantage of the Shopping Basket Programme, set up a vegetable supplying and selling operation in Shenzhen which became one of the largest Shenzhen providers. In 1997, the operation was incorporated as Shenzhen Xinbaokang Vegetable Industries Co., Ltd., later renamed as Shenzhen Xinbaokang Industrial Development Co., Ltd. before adopting its current name in 2000. In 2003, Baoneng took a majority stake in the state owned enterprise (SOE) Shum Yip Logistics, which led to Baoneng taking control of land and other properties, allowing it to gain an advantage on the expanding Chinese property market. In 2005, the company built Shenzhen Baoneng All City, a mix of residential and commercial facilities which became a success. By 2009 the company launched similar ventures throughout China, achieving a growth of about 30% annually for several years. In 2012, Baoneng Group set up Qian Hai Life Insurance Co., Ltd., entering into the finance business.

Failed Vanke takeover
In 2015, Baoneng, through its subsidiaries Shenzhen Jushenghua Corporation and Qian Hai Life Insurance, attempted an hostile takeover of public (although de facto state-controlled) rival Vanke. In July 2015, Baoneng acquired an initial 5% of Vanke, raising it to 15.25% by November, surpassing SOE China Resources as the largest shareholder. On 11 December 2015, Baoneng had a 22.45% stake. Vanke chairman Wang Shi openly opposed the takeover, and in that month Vanke temporarily left the stock exchange to block Baoneng's continued stock acquisition, accusing it of obtaining funds through allegedly illicit methods. The CSRC actioned against Baoneng, finally leading to the suspension of its insurance business, while  Vanke retook its shares.

Operations

Financial services and property business
The Baoneng Group comprises about 40 companies in real estate, logistics, microfinance, education, healthcare.

Baoneng has over 40 shopping malls in China.

Automotive business
In 2017,
the Baoneng Group acquired a 63% controlling stake in the automobile maker Qoros. Chery took a 25% and Kenon Holdings the remaining 12%.  That same year, the Baoneng Group set up the subsidiary Baoneng Motor to manage its automotive business. Baoneng launched projects to build new energy vehicle plants in Kunshan, Xixian, Kunming, Hangzhou, Xi'an, and Guangzhou.

In January 2020, the Baoneng Group agreed to acquire the assets of Changan PSA from stockholders Changan Auto and Groupe PSA through its wholly owned subsidiary Shenzhen Qianhai Ruizhi Investment. In May 2020, after the transaction was completed, Changan PSA was dissolved and its facilities renamed as Shenzhen Baoneng Motor Co.,Ltd. The vice president of the Baoneng Group, Sun Li, became the legal representative of the new company.

References

External links

Real estate companies of China
Companies based in Shenzhen